The Long Beach Bridge is a twin drawbridge crossing Reynolds Channel, connecting Long Beach and Island Park, New York. There is no toll. The bridge starts in Long Beach as Long Beach Boulevard. At Barnum Island, the main road continues northeast as Austin Boulevard, while Long Beach Road branches to the north. Each span carries traffic in one direction.

History 
The twin bridges were built in 1953 to replace an earlier bridge built in 1922. It the replacement spans were constructed after it was realized that the original, 1922 span was functionally and structurally obsolete.

See also 

 Bayville Bridge – Another drawbridge in Nassau County.

References

External links
 Long Beach Bridge @ NYCRoads.com

Hempstead, New York
Bridge
Bridges in Nassau County, New York
Road bridges in New York (state)
Steel bridges in the United States
Bascule bridges in the United States